The Special Achievement Award is an Academy Award given for an achievement that makes an exceptional contribution to the motion picture for which it was created, but for which there is no annual award category. Many of the film projects that received these awards were noted for breaking new ground in terms of technology, where an awards category simply did not yet exist for the given area. New awards categories were often opened in following years. For example, Toy Story was awarded a special achievement award as the first computer animated feature film in 1996, before the best animated feature category debuted in 2001.

The award may only be conferred for achievements in productions that also qualify as an eligible release for distinguished achievements and meet the Academy's eligibility year and deadlines requirements. Special Achievement Awards were primarily given between the 1970s and 1990s, with only a single award being given since 2000.

Recipients
This table displays the individuals who received the Special Achievement Oscar for their contributions to film. The category was inaugurated in 1972.

References

Special Achievement Award
Awards established in 1972
Awards disestablished in 1995